Mircea Sfetescu (born 1 July 1905, date of death unknown) was a Romanian rugby union player. He played as a centre.

He had 4 caps for Romania, from 1924 to 1927. He played the two games at the 1924 Olympic tournament, where Romania, even losing to France and the United States, won the 3rd place for the first ever Bronze medal of his country at the Summer Olympic Games.

See also
 List of Romania national rugby union players

References

External links
 
 

1905 births
Year of death missing
Romanian rugby union players
Romania international rugby union players
Rugby union centres
Olympic rugby union players of Romania
Olympic bronze medalists for Romania
Rugby union players at the 1924 Summer Olympics
Medalists at the 1924 Summer Olympics